Independence is an unincorporated community in Defiance County, in the U.S. state of Ohio.

History
Independence was founded around 1838.

References

Unincorporated communities in Defiance County, Ohio
Unincorporated communities in Ohio